Ivesia lycopodioides is a species of flowering plant in the rose family known by the common name clubmoss mousetail, or clubmoss ivesia. It is native to the Sierra Nevada and to regions east of the range in California. It may also be found beyond the state line into Nevada. This is a perennial herb which grows in the crevices of rock ledges in the mountains and in wet high-elevation meadows. It produces a rosette of flat to cylindrical leaves up to 15 centimeters long, each of which is made up of many tiny, lobed leaflets. The stems may grow erect or drooping to 30 centimeters long and each holds an inflorescence of clustered flowers. Each flower has hairy, greenish triangular sepals and much larger oval-shaped petals of bright yellow. In the center of the flower are usually five stamens and several pistils. There are three subspecies.

External links
Jepson Manual Treatment; Ivesia lycopodioides
Ivesia lycopodioides — U.C. Photo gallery

lycopodioides
Flora of the Sierra Nevada (United States)
Flora of California
Flora of Nevada
Endemic flora of the United States
Flora without expected TNC conservation status